The Lanzhou Botanical Garden (Chinese: 兰州植物园) is a botanical garden located in north-western part of the city's Anning District, near the Science Park of Lanzhou Jiaotong University. The 214 ha large park was constructed in 1993 and features over 200 plant species situated around a 19 ha pond

See also
List of Chinese gardens
List of botanical gardens

References 

Botanical gardens in China
Buildings and structures in Lanzhou